is a Japanese manga by Kiwa Irie. It was adapted into two television drama series in 1997 and 1998 and a live-action film in 2009.

Awards
31st Yokohama Film Festival
Best Director - Akira Ogata
Best Actress - Manami Konishi
Best Supporting Actor - Yoshinori Okada
4th Best Film

References

External links
 

1995 manga
1997 Japanese television series debuts
1997 Japanese television series endings
1998 Japanese television series debuts
1998 Japanese television series endings
Japanese drama television series
Japanese television dramas based on manga
Kodansha manga
Live-action films based on manga
Manga adapted into films
Seinen manga
Japanese comedy-drama films